Ladislas Poniatowski (born 10 November 1946) is a French politician.

He served on the National Assembly for Eure's 3rd constituency from 1986 to 1998, when he was elected to the Senate, representing the Eure department. Poniatowski's tenure as a senator ended in 2020. As a deputy, Poniatowski was affiliated with the Union for French Democracy. He subsequently joined the Union for a Popular Movement, and later The Republicans. He is the son of Michel Poniatowski and older brother of Axel Poniatowski.

References

1946 births
Living people
French Senators of the Fifth Republic
Union for a Popular Movement politicians
French people of Polish descent
Ladislas
Senators of Eure
People from Boulogne-Billancourt
Politicians from Île-de-France
The Republicans (France) politicians
Deputies of the 8th National Assembly of the French Fifth Republic
Deputies of the 9th National Assembly of the French Fifth Republic
Deputies of the 10th National Assembly of the French Fifth Republic
Deputies of the 11th National Assembly of the French Fifth Republic
Union for French Democracy politicians